Ingersleben is a municipality in the Börde district in Saxony-Anhalt, Germany. It was formed on 1 January 2010 by the merger of the former municipalities Alleringersleben, Eimersleben, Morsleben and Ostingersleben.

References 

Börde (district)